BKS Bielsko-Biała, is the women's volleyball department of Polish sports club BKS Stal Bielsko-Biała based in Bielsko-Biała and plays in the Orlen Liga.

Previous names
Due to sponsorship, the club have competed under the following names:
 BKS Stal Bielsko-Biała (1951–2006)
 BKS Aluprof Bielsko-Biała (2006–2015)
 BKS Aluprof Profi Credit Bielsko-Biała (2015–2016)
 BKS Profi Credit Bielsko-Biała (2016–present)

History
The sports club  was established in 1922 and through the years had many different sports departments (today only the men's football and the later founded women's volleyball are still active). All activities were suspended during World War II and when the club resumed its activities after the war, with sports facility reconstruction efforts, it was under the patronage of several industries, most notably the Bielska Fabryka Maszyn Włókienniczych (Bielsko Sewing Machine factory or in short "Befama"), and as sports associations were under supervision of trade unions, the club was renamed  (Bialski Sports Club Steel). It was under this set up that in 1951 the women's volleyball department was created. It has various teams (girls, youth, second and first senior team) playing across many divisions in the Polish leagues. The main senior team reached the first division three years after its foundation and in the 1954–55 season won the Polish Cup for the first time, with a second Cup title arriving in 1978–79. During the late 1980s the club achieved success winning the Polish Championships for four consecutive years (1987–88, 1988–89, 1989–90, 1990–91) and three consecutive Polish Cups (1987–88, 1988–89, 1989–90). In the period that followed, the club won another four Championships (1995–96, 2002–03, 2003–04, 2009–10), three Cups (2003–04, 2005–06, 2008–09) and two Polish Super Cups (2006, 2010).

Honours

National competitions
  Polish Championship: 8
1987–88, 1988–89, 1989–90, 1990–91, 1995–96, 2002–03, 2003–04, 2009–10

  Polish Cup: 8
1954–55, 1978–79, 1987–88, 1988–89, 1989–90, 2003–04, 2005–06, 2008–09

  Polish Super Cup: 2
2006, 2010

Team
2016–2017 squad, as per March 2017.

References

External links

Official website 

Volleyball clubs established in 1951
1951 establishments in Poland
Women's volleyball teams in Poland
Sport in Bielsko-Biała